Yedibahoma Datoma Libambani (born 13 January 1979) is a Togolese former football striker who last played for Talia Club Seeb.

Career
His club were beaten in the final of the African Cup Winners' Cup final in December by Africa Sports of the Ivory Coast. Yedibahoma played three years for Al-Nahda in the Omani League and signed in 2009 for Talia Club Seeb.

International career
In 1998, he scored on his debut for the national team against São Tomé and Príncipe but did not play for the next 12 months.

References

1979 births
Living people
Association football forwards
Togolese footballers
Expatriate footballers in Oman
Expatriate footballers in Ghana
Expatriate footballers in Tunisia
Club Africain players
Liberty Professionals F.C. players
Al-Nahda Club (Oman) players
Togolese expatriate sportspeople in Ghana
Togo international footballers
2000 African Cup of Nations players
Togolese expatriate footballers
Togolese expatriate sportspeople in Oman
Togolese expatriate sportspeople in Tunisia
21st-century Togolese people